Varasudu is a 1993 Indian Telugu-language action film, produced by D. Kishore under the Sri Jayabheri Art Productions banner, presented by Murali Mohan, directed by E. V. V. Satyanarayana and cinematography by Chota K. Naidu. It stars Nagarjuna, Nagma and Krishna, with music composed by M. M. Keeravani. It is a remake of the Hindi film Phool Aur Kaante (1991) which is loosely based on the Malayalam film Parampara (1990). The film was a commercial success. The film completed a 200 day theatrical run.

Plot
Vinay (Nagarjuna) studies in college where Keerthi (Nagma) enters as a new student.  Vamsi is also a student in the same college.  His character has negative shades. The first half of the movie revolves mostly around the love story of the hero and heroine.  Dharma Teja happens to rescue Vinay from the villains (Srikanth's father and his friend), but Vinay hates Dharma Teja. An interval arrives disclosing the fact that Dharma Teja is the father of Vinay.

The second half of the movie becomes serious with Vinay's allegation on his father stating that he is a smuggler and has killed his wife. Vinay and Keerthi get married.  Dharma Teja shoots Vamsi, as he tries to murder Vinay. However, the villains continue to show their grudge on Vinay. Meanwhile, Vinay's child is kidnapped. Keerthi goes to Dharma Teja for help.

Vinay finds that Dharma Teja has kidnapped the child.  When asked for an explanation, Dharma Teja narrates the flashback, where he had to leave his wife to save the life of his son.  Vinay and Dharma Teja are now united, much to the envy of the villains. The villains now kidnap Vinay's son, leading to the climax.

Cast

Soundtrack

The music was composed by M. M. Keeravani. Music released on AKASH Audio Company.

Box Office
The film was a commercial success. The film completed a 200 day theatrical run. The film created hype before its release due to the collaboration of  Nagarjuna and Krishna.

References

External links
 

1993 films
1993 action drama films
Films scored by M. M. Keeravani
Films directed by E. V. V. Satyanarayana
1990s Telugu-language films
Indian action drama films
1993 drama films
Telugu remakes of Hindi films